The Livonia electoral district was a constituency created for the 1917 Russian Constituent Assembly election. The electoral district covered the Livonia Governorate, as well as the parts of the Courland Governorate not under German occupation.

97,781 votes (72%) were cast for Social-Democracy of the Latvian Territory, the Bolshevik affiliate organization in Latvia. Latvia was a Bolshevik stronghold at the time, as only in Latvia did the Social Democrats continue to function as a political party following the waves of repression 1905–1908. After the February Revolution, the political scene in Riga was similar to that of many other cities in Russia, with Bolsheviks becoming the dominant force in the soviets and competing for power with the moderate socialists and the city duma. By May 1917 the Bolsheviks had emerged as the main political force of Latvian Riflemen's soviet. Gradually the Bolsheviks began to dominate Riga, but on September 3, 1917 German troops seized control of the city. In September 1917 the Bolsheviks had some 12,000 members in Latvia, the Mensheviks had 2,600.

Results
At the time of the election the city of Riga was under German occupation so no vote took place there. Some 9,000 votes were missing from the accounted vote tally according to U.S. historian Oliver Henry Radkey (whose account forms the basis of the results' table below). Radkey's  carries the same totals as a resolution of the District Election Commission adopted November 26, 1917, reported in the Bolshevik organ Cīņa; which noted that all precincts in Kreis Wolmar had reported, the tallies of 4 precincts in Kreis Wenden were missing, 2 precincts in Kreis Walk were missing and 11 out of 16 precincts in Kreis Riga reporting.

References

Electoral districts of the Russian Constituent Assembly election, 1917
Governorate of Livonia